Serbian League Vojvodina is a section of the Serbian League, Serbia's third football league. Teams from Vojvodina are in this section of the league. The other sections are Serbian League East, Serbian League West, and Serbian League Belgrade.

League table

Top scorers 

 Last updated: April 22, 2008

Stadia

External links 
 www.srpskaliga.co.yu/voj-rezultati

Serbian League Vojvodina seasons
3
Serb